von Santen / Zanten (spelled variously, including van Santen, van Zanten, and de Zanten) is the name of a German noble family from the Rhineland. One of the oldest extant German aristocratic families, they belong to the Uradel (‘ancient nobility’) of the Prince-Bishopric of Münster.

History
The earliest known member of the family is Johannes de Santen, a ministerial of the Prince-Bishop of Münster circa 1295. The family served the Prince-Bishops as knights for several centuries until moving north to the County of East Friesland following the Reformation. They joined the patriciate of Emden and became considerable landowners in the surrounding area and, after 1744, other parts of Prussia. Eventually the family dispersed, and members now live all over the world.

Heraldry
Escutcheon: Argent, to a naissant stag Gules, mouv, of three fess wavy Azure in base and accompanied in chief in sinister of a rose of the second. Crest: an issuant stag Gules.

Notes

References 
 Otto Titan von Hefner. Der Adel des Königreichs Preußen. J. Siebmachers's großes Wappenbuch, Band 3, Abt. 1. Nürnberg, 1857.
 Otto Titan von Hefner. Ergänzungsband, enthaltend die Nachträge und Ergänzungen zu den Staatenwappen von Russland und Baden, ferner zu dem Adel von Bayern, (Grafen und Freiherren), Sachsen, Schwarzburg, Waldeck, Württemberg, Mecklenburg u. Tyrol. J. Siebmachers's großes Wappenbuch, Band 7, Abt. 1. Nürnberg, 1858.
 Ulrike Hindersmann. Der ritterschaftliche Adel im Königreich Hannover 1814-1866. Hannover, 2001.
 Ernst Heinrich Kneschke. Neues allgemeines Deutsches Adels-Lexicon im Verein mit mehreren Historikern herausgegeben Band 8. Leipzig, 1868.
 Leopold von Ledebur. Adelslexicon der Preussischen Monarchie. Band 2. Berlin, 1856.
 J.B. Rietstap. Armorial général, précedé d'un Dictionnaire des termes du blason. Book 2. Gouda: 1887.
 Rolf Uphoff. ‘Hieronymus Ibeling von Santen.’ Ostfriesische Landschaft, Biographisches Lexikon 4. Aurich, 2007.
 Roger Wilmans. Die Urkunden des Bisthums Münster von 1201-1300. Münster, 1871.
 Marcus Weidner. ‘Die Matrikel der landtagsfähigen (und "dubiosen") Häuser des Fürstbistums Münster von 1704.’ Westfälische Zeitschrift - Zeitschrift für vaterländische Geschichte und Altertumskunde 147 (1997): 93-178.

German noble families
European noble families
Prussian nobility